Elmar Liebenberg (born 28 March 1973) is a South African cricketer. He played in four first-class matches for Boland in 1995/96 and 1996/97.

See also
 List of Boland representative cricketers

References

External links
 

1973 births
Living people
South African cricketers
Boland cricketers
Cricketers from Paarl